The lawn bowls competitions at the 2017 Southeast Asian Games in Kuala Lumpur were held at National Lawn Bowls Centre.

Medal table

Medalists

Men

Women

See also
Boccia at the 2017 ASEAN Para Games
Pétanque at the 2017 Southeast Asian Games

References

External links
  

2017 Southeast Asian Games events